Neocollyris paradoxa is a species of ground beetle in the genus Neocollyris in the family Carabidae. It was described by Matalin and Naviaux in 2008.

References

Paradoxa, Neocollyris
Beetles described in 2008